Dnipro is a city in Ukraine.

Dnipro may also refer to:

Places
Dnipro River is a Ukrainian name for the river also called the Dnieper.
Dnipro Valley, the river valley of the Dnipro
Dnipro Raion, Dnipro Oblast, Ukraine; a district
Dnipro Raion, Kyiv, Ukraine; a district
Dnipro Oblast, a province of Ukraine

Facilities and structures
Dnipro International Airport, Dnipro, Ukraine
Dnipro railway station, Dnipro, Ukraine
 Dnipro (Kyiv Metro), a station on the Kyiv Metro
 Dnipro-Arena, a soccer stadium in Dnipro, Ukraine
 Dnipro Polytechnic, Dnipro, Ukraine
 Dnipro Hydroelectric Station, Zaporizhzhia, Ukraine; a hydroelectric station and dam
 Hotel Dnipro, a hotel in Kyiv, Ukraine

Sport 
 Dnipro (bandy), a Ukrainian bandy club based in Dnipro
 FC Dnipro, a former Ukrainian professional football club dissolved in 2019 
 FC Dnipro-2 Dnipropetrovsk
 FC Dnipro-3 Dnipropetrovsk
 FC Dnipro-75 Dnipropetrovsk
 SC Dnipro-1, a Ukrainian professional football club based in Dnipro
 BC Dnipro, a Ukrainian basketball club based in Dnipro
 FC Dnipro Cherkasy, a former Ukrainian professional football club from Cherkasy
 FC Cherkaskyi Dnipro, now FC Cherkashchyna

Military
 Dnipro (surface-to-air missile), a Ukrainian missile
 Dnipro-1 Regiment, a police regiment of Ukraine
 39th Territorial Defence Battalion 'Dnipro-2' (Ukraine), a Ukrainian army battalion

Other uses
 Dnipro (magazine), a Ukrainian monthly magazine
 DniproAvia, an airline

See also 

 Dnipro barbel, a fish
 Dnipro-Donets culture, a prehistoric people
 Dnipro National University of Rail Transport, Dnipro, Ukraine

 Dniprovskyi District (disambiguation)
 Dnipro Dnipropetrovsk (disambiguation)
 Dnipropetrovsk (disambiguation)
 Dnieper (disambiguation)
 Dnepr (disambiguation)